Cass Bauer-Bilodeau (born Cassandra Sue Bauer on June 27, 1972) is an American former collegiate and professional basketball player.

Basketball career 
A native of Hysham, Montana, she graduated in 1994 from Montana State University, where she played for their basketball team, nicknamed The Bobcats, and earned a degree in nursing.  She led the Bobcats to their first championship in the Big Sky Conference.

She began her professional career in 1996 with the Columbus Quest in the now-defunct American Basketball League (ABL).  She became the ABL's all-time free throw percentage leader, making 147 out of 168 free throws for an average of 87 percent.

After the ABL folded due to financial difficulties, she joined the Women's National Basketball Association (WNBA) from 1999 to 2002, playing for the Charlotte Sting, the Washington Mystics, and the Sacramento Monarchs. Citing pain in her right knee, she announced her retirement shortly before the 2003 season.

Personal life 
In 2000, she married her longtime boyfriend, Brent Bilodeau, an American/Canadian professional ice hockey player who was playing in the East Coast Hockey League.

She subsequently moved with her family to Las Vegas, Nevada and worked as a critical care and emergency department registered nurse.

References

External links 
WNBA Player Profile
December 26, 2005 Bozeman Daily Chronicle article
November 29, 2005 Las Vegas Review-Journal article on her family

1972 births
Living people
American women's basketball players
Basketball players from Montana
Charlotte Sting players
Columbus Quest players
Long Beach Stingrays players
Montana State Bobcats women's basketball players
People from Hysham, Montana
Philadelphia Rage players
Sacramento Monarchs players
Small forwards
Washington Mystics players